Gowd Zagh (also Romanized as Gowd Zāgh) is a village in Pol Beh Pain Rural District, Simakan District, Jahrom County, Fars Province, Iran. At the 2006 census, its population was 411, in 94 families.

References 

Populated places in Jahrom County